Nicolas Mahut and Édouard Roger-Vasselin were the defending champions, but chose not to participate together.  Roger-Vasselin teamed up with Rohan Bopanna, but lost in the semifinals to Johan Brunström and Raven Klaasen.
Mahut played alongside Jo-Wilfried Tsonga, but lost in the final to Brunström and Klaasen, 4–6, 6–7(5–7).

Seeds

Draw

Draw

References
 Main Draw

2013 Moselle Open